Michael Cavlan (born 1959) is a Minnesota political activist and registered nurse living in Minneapolis.

Personal life
Cavlan was born in San Jose, California, but spent most of his childhood and adolescence in Northern Ireland with his Roman Catholic family. Cavlan lived near Belfast, Northern Ireland from 1969 till 1984.  He Became involved in the Irish Trade Union Movement as a member of ITGWU (the Irish Transport and General Workers Union) and IVG&ATA (the Irish Vintners, Grocers & Allied Trades Association). He is married with two sons, and is a nephew of Ballymoney Sinn Féin councillor, Anita Cavlan (born 1949).

He is a registered nurse working in Minnesota and was a volunteer for the National Disaster Medical System. He specializes for years in burns, trauma and intensive care. In the aftermath of the 9/11 terrorist attacks, he volunteered to assist in caring for wounded survivors. Cavlan called for an official investigation into possible government involvement in the death of Minnesota Senator Paul Wellstone, a call which was the subject of an article in the Star Tribune. Cavlan has also called for independent investigations into the 2001 September 11 attacks and the issues of voter fraud targeting mainly poor people and minorities as well as Diebold, ES&S and Triad electronic vote counting manipulations.

Green Party involvement
Cavlan's first attempt at electoral politics was a run for the state legislature in 2002 as a Green Party candidate. He almost failed to achieve party endorsement when he refused to disavow support for the use of violence by the Provisional Irish Republican Army. Cavlan's run ended almost as soon as it began  when he lost the contested Green primary. The contest was the only primary for the Green Party. This was one of the only primary races for the Green Party in Minnesota. His primary opponent was a former Mayor of St Louis Park for the Democratic Party.

Following the disputed Ohio election in 2004, Cavlan went to that state to help with the Green Party's effort to recount Ohio's votes after the 2004 election. Cavlan announced his 2006 candidacy to run for Senate in October 2004 on the Green Party ticket. He faced Republican candidate Mark Kennedy, Independence Party candidate Robert Fitzgerald and the election's winner, Minnesota Democratic-Farmer-Labor Party candidate Amy Klobuchar, in the general election. Shortly after the election, Cavlan announced his candidacy for the 2008 Senate election.  However, at the 2008 Minnesota Green Party convention, he failed to gain the nomination by one vote.

A decades long peace activist, Cavlan has called for immediate troop withdrawal from Afghanistan. Among other issues, he is pro-choice, opposes the death penalty, drug prohibition, and school vouchers, and supports gay marriage. During his 2006 Senate campaign he declared:

For the 2012 Minnesota U.S. Senate election, he ran as a candidate for the Minnesota Open Progressive party.

Electoral history
2006 election for U.S. Senate - Minnesota
Amy Klobuchar (D), 58% 
Mark Kennedy (R), 38% 
Robert Fitzgerald (I), 3%
Michael Cavlan (G), 0.5%
2012 election for U.S. Senate - Minnesota
Amy Klobuchar (D), 65.23%
Kurt Bills (R), 30.53%
Stephen Williams (Independence Party), 2.59%
Tim Davis, (Grassroots), 1.07%
Michael Cavlan (MN Open Progressives), 0.49%
Write-in, 0.09%

References

External links
Minnesota Public Radio profile
Cavlan's Brigade (Minnesota Public Radio)

1959 births
Living people
American social democrats
Activists from California
Minnesota Greens
American expatriates in the United Kingdom
American LGBT rights activists